Lepinotus is a genus of granary booklice in the family Trogiidae. There are about 12 described species in Lepinotus.

Species
These 12 species belong to the genus Lepinotus:

 Lepinotus angolensis Badonnel, 1955
 Lepinotus fuscus Broadhead & Richards, 1982
 Lepinotus huoni Schmidt & New, 2008
 Lepinotus indicus Badonnel, 1981
 Lepinotus inquilinus Heyden, 1850
 Lepinotus lepinotoides (Ribaga, 1911)
 Lepinotus machadoi Badonnel, 1971
 Lepinotus patruelis Pearman, 1931
 Lepinotus reticulatus Enderlein, 1904 (reticulate-winged trogiid)
 Lepinotus stoneae Smithers, 1992
 Lepinotus tasmaniensis Hickman, 1934
 Lepinotus vermicularis Lienhard, 1996

References

External links

 

Trogiidae
Articles created by Qbugbot